William O'Kane is a Northern Irish former footballer.
He played as a defender.

Club career
O'Kane began his career with Derry City F.C. He signed for Nottingham Forest in November 1968 and made his League debut on 30 April 1969 against Leeds United F.C. Initially, he succeeded Terry Hennessey at centre back, but in 1971 he moved to right back and stayed there for the rest of his career. His best period was 1973–76, on his return from a broken leg, but injuries were never far away and they finally finished him as a player in the 1975–76 season, when he was still only 28.

International career
During his career, and despite being troubled persistently by injuries, O'Kane made 20 international appearances for Northern Ireland.

Coaching
O'Kane moved onto the coaching staff at Nottingham Forest after his playing days and was the only man to have survived throughout the Brian Clough years until Joe Kinnear arrived at the club. O'Kane finally left his position at the club in early 2005 after a 36-year spell.

References

Living people
Year of birth missing (living people)
Association footballers from Northern Ireland
Sportspeople from Derry (city)
Derry City F.C. players
Nottingham Forest F.C. players
Northern Ireland international footballers
Shamrock Rovers F.C. guest players
Association football defenders
Nottingham Forest F.C. non-playing staff